Armadale Academy is a secondary school in Armadale, West Lothian. Opened in 1969, the academy moved to its current location in 2009. It is split into three houses: Cochran, Honeyman, and Wood. Armadale Academy's mission statement is “Learning Together, Achieving Together.” The school's staff and students are encouraged to focus on community building, and celebration of success.

History
The first school in Armadale was opened in 1819, paid for mainly from the bequest of John Newland (the bulk of which paid for Bathgate Academy).

Several other private schools were opened in the 19th century, many financed by mining companies.

Following the introduction of compulsory education in 1877, the North School was built on Bullion Brae (now Academy Road). This remained the main place of education until the 1960s, when the county council decided a new school was needed, and purchased land formerly occupied by the pithead buildings of a coal mine. The shaft was filled in, and the colliery and bing were reclaimed to form playing fields. The school building, designed to accommodate 700 students, was opened on 29 March 1968 by Margaret Herbison MP, at an estimated final cost of £536,500.

By the 21st century, it was becoming increasingly clear that the '60s building was no longer fit for purpose. The council agreed to finance a new building, to be built on the same site and opened for the 2009/2010 session. This new school was officially opened on 28 September 2009 by Fiona Hyslop MSP.

References

Secondary schools in West Lothian
Schools in West Lothian
1969 establishments in Scotland
Educational institutions established in 1969
Armadale, West Lothian
School buildings completed in 2009